The brain, like most other internal organs, or offal, can serve as nourishment. Brains used for nourishment include those of pigs, squirrels, rabbits, horses, cattle, monkeys, chickens, camels, fish, lamb, and goats. In many cultures, different types of brain are considered a delicacy.

Cultural consumption

The brain of animals features in French cuisine, in dishes such as cervelle de veau and tête de veau. A dish called maghaz is a popular cuisine in Pakistan, Bangladesh, parts of India, and diaspora countries. In Turkish cuisine, brain can be fried, baked, or consumed as a salad. In Chinese cuisine, brain is a delicacy in Chongqing or Sichuan cuisine, and it is often cooked in spicy hot pot or barbecued. In the southern part of China, pig brain is used for tianma zhunao tang. In South India, goat brain curry or fry is a delicacy. Even in Mumbai, the local indigenous East Indian community has their own version of brain masala curry.

Similar delicacies from around the world include the Mexican tacos de sesos. The Anyang tribe of Cameroon practiced a tradition in which a new tribal chief would consume the brain of a hunted gorilla, while another senior member of the tribe would eat the heart. Indonesian cuisine specialty in Minangkabau cuisine also has a dish consisting of beef brain in a coconut-milk gravy named gulai banak (beef brain curry).  In the Philippines, tuslob buwa is a popular street food in the regional capital of Cebu City made from fried pig brain.  In Cuban cuisine, "brain fritters" are made by coating pieces of brain with bread crumbs and then frying them.
In the Ohio River Valley fried brain sandwiches are popular, especially in the Evansville, Indiana area.

Nutritional composition
DHA, an important omega-3 fatty acid, is found concentrated in mammalian brains.  For example, according to Nutrition Data, 85g (3 oz) of cooked beef brain contains 727 mg of DHA.  By way of comparison, the NIH has determined that small children need at least 150 mg of DHA per day, and pregnant and lactating women need at least 300 mg of DHA.

The makeup of the brain is about 12% lipids, most of which are located in myelin (which itself is 70–80% fat). Specific fatty acid ratios will depend in part on the diet of the animal it is harvested from. The brain is also very high in cholesterol. For example, a single 140g (5 oz) serving of "pork brains in milk gravy" can contain 3500 mg of cholesterol (1170% of the USRDA).

Prions 

Beef brain consumption has been linked to Variant Creutzfeldt–Jakob disease outbreaks in humans which lead to strict regulations about what parts of cattle can be sold for human consumption in numerous countries. Another prion disease called kuru has been traced to a funerary ritual among the Fore people of Papua New Guinea in which those close to the dead would eat the brain of the deceased to create a sense of immortality.

References

External links
 

Offal